Leucopogon polymorphus is a small plant in the family Ericaceae, endemic to Western Australia. It is a shrub, growing from 0.2 m to 1 m high, on sandy soils. Its white flowers may be seen from June to October. 

It was first described in 1845 by Otto Wilhelm Sonder.

References 

polymorphus
Ericales of Australia
Flora of Western Australia
Plants described in 1845
Taxa named by Otto Wilhelm Sonder